Harbin University (HrbU) is a comprehensive college located in Harbin, Heilongjiang Province, People's Republic of China. In 1999, the original four municipal schools and two colleges (Harbin Teachers College, Harbin University, Harbin Institute of Education, Harbin Adult Education College, Harbin Normal School, and Harbin School of Finance and Economics) were integrated to form Harbin University.

References

Universities and colleges in Harbin